Prężynka  is a village in the administrative district of Gmina Lubrza, within Prudnik County, Opole Voivodeship, in south-western Poland, close to the Czech border.

The village has a population of 320.

Notable residents
 Albert Battel (21 January 1891 – 1952), German Righteous Among the Nations

References

Villages in Prudnik County